Margaridisa is a genus of flea beetles in the  family Chrysomelidae. There are at least 16 described species in Margaridisa.

Species
These sixteen species belong to the genus Margaridisa:
 Margaridisa acalyphaea  Bechyné, 1997
 Margaridisa atriventris (F. E. Melsheimer, 1847)
 Margaridisa bahiensis  (Bryant, 1942)
 Margaridisa benficana  Bechyné & Bechyné, 1961
 Margaridisa buritiensis  Bechyné & Bechyné, 1978
 Margaridisa flavescens  (Baly, 1976)
 Margaridisa genalis  Bechyné & Bechyné, 1978
 Margaridisa hippuriphilina  Bechyné & Bechyné, 1978
 Margaridisa laevisulcata  Bechyné & Bechyné, 1978
 Margaridisa luciana  (Bechyné, 1955)
 Margaridisa managua  (Bechyné, 1957)
 Margaridisa mattogrossensis  (Bechyné, 1954)
 Margaridisa mera  Bechyné & Bechyné, 1978
 Margaridisa osmidia  (Bechyné, 1955)
 Margaridisa praesignata  Bechyné, 1997
 Margaridisa reticulaticollis  (Bechyné, 1955)
 Margaridisa triangularis  Bechyné & Bechyné, 1978

References

Further reading

 
 
 

Alticini
Chrysomelidae genera